Thottapuzhassery is a place in  Thiruvalla taluk in Kerala, India. It is situated opposite Aranmula.It Is Part Of Thiruvalla Sub-District.

Location
Thottapuzhassery is a village panchayat in Thiruvalla Taluk, Pathanamthitta District of Kerala State. Thottapuzhassery shares its boundaries with the holy River Pampa and three other panchayats, namely Ezhumatoor, Koipuram and Ayroor.

Tourism
Tourist sites in Thottapuzhassery include the Aruvikuzhi waterfalls, Charalkunnu Camp Center, Ponmalla, Retreat center Maramon, Pramadathu para, Mayiladumpara etc. Charalkunnu is a hill-station in Thottappuzhassery Panchayat.

History
Thottapuzhassery has a traditional and religious past and is mentioned in many religious myths. It is the main venue for the Christian Convention called Maramon Convention, which takes place during the third week of every February.

This place is historically related with the birth and growth of Malankara Mar Thoma Syrian Church and this village has Mayiladumpara Siva Temple, which is founded by Thapasyomal for the downtrodden people in the society. As per the believes this temple was founded very before Sree Narayana Guru.

Snake Boat
There is a Palliyodam (snake boat) named Thottapuzhassery. Every year it competes in the 'uthrattathi vallamkalie '(snake boat race)  Aranmula Boat Race . It also accompanies Thiruvonathoni Goshayatra to Aranmula Temple. This place is between the Kozhancherry - Arattupuzha - Chengannur road.

Devi Temple
This village also has a famous old temple of Devi. On festival day there is a traditional Padayani (folk dance).

Border of west Thottapuzhassery @ maramon mosco padi after that koipuram panchyath belongs to Thiruvalla Town

References 

Villages in Pathanamthitta district
Villages in Thiruvalla taluk